Copeville is an unincorporated community in southeastern Collin County, Texas, United States, along State Highway 78 near the east shore of Lavon Lake.

History
Copeville was named for John Miles Cope (January 5, 1827 – July 14, 1902), one of the earliest settlers to arrive in the area. Along with his father and brother he organized the community in the 1850s. In 1886 it moved about a mile east from its original location to its current site after the Gulf, Colorado and Santa Fe Railway was built through the area.

Population
The population of Copeville may have reached 300 in 1915. The population estimate had fallen to 240 in 1926. It remained at that number throughout the 1920s and 1930s due to the Great Depression, mechanization of farming, and job opportunities offered in the Dallas metropolitan area. In 1943 a further decline to 150 was reported. Until the early 1970s that estimate remained constant. The town had two churches, five businesses, and a school in 1947. Copeville had 106 residents and seven businesses in 1986 and 1990. In 2000 that number remained unchanged.

Education
The community of Copeville is served by the Community Independent School District.

Notable people
 Aubrey Otis Hampton, radiologist who described Hampton's hump and Hampton's line.
 J. Weldon Jones, acting High Commissioner to the Philippines,
 Charlie Walker, country musician; member of the Grand Ole Opry.
 Charles "Tex" Watson, convicted spree killer and former member of the Manson Family.

References

External links 
 TopoQuest
 TX HomeTownLocator
 Roadside Thoughts

Unincorporated communities in Collin County, Texas
Unincorporated communities in Texas
Dallas–Fort Worth metroplex
Populated places established in the 1850s